Clube Desportivo Construtores do Uíge, formerly M.C.H. do Uíge is an Angolan sports club from the northern city of Uíge.
The team currently plays in the Gira Angola.

The club, one of the debutants in the first edition of the Girabola after independence, in 1979, is named after its then sponsor, Angola's Ministry of Construction and Housing (in Portuguese: Ministério da Construção e Habitação). After being relegated in 1984, the club remained many years inactive due to financial shortages. In the late 2000s it was revived.

Achievements
Angolan League: 0

Angolan Cup: 0

Angolan SuperCup: 0

Gira Angola: 0

Uíge provincial championship: 1 
 2014

League Positions

Manager history

Players

2014

1979-1982

See also
Girabola
Gira Angola

References

External links
 Official blog
 Girabola.com Profile

Association football clubs established in 1978
Football clubs in Angola
Sports clubs in Angola